The following is a list of churches in the City of Milton Keynes.

All parishes except Astwood, Fairfields, Hardmead, Warrington and Whitehouse have at least one active church.

Active churches 
The borough has an estimated 115 active churches for 255,700 people, a ratio of one church to every 2,223 people.

Defunct churches

References 

Milton Keynes